"Takin' Care of Business" is a song written by Randy Bachman and first recorded by Canadian rock group Bachman–Turner Overdrive (BTO) for their 1973 album Bachman–Turner Overdrive II. The lead vocal is sung by Randy.

Development 
Randy Bachman had developed what would later become "Takin' Care of Business" while still a member of The Guess Who. His original idea was to write about a recording technician who worked on The Guess Who's recordings. This particular technician would take the 8:15 train to get to work, inspiring the lyrics "take the 8:15 into the city".

In the early arrangement for the song, which had the working title "White Collar Worker", the chorus riff and vocal melody were similar to that of The Beatles' "Paperback Writer" (which in turn was inspired by a Chuck Berry song Johnny B. Goode). When Bachman first played this version for Burton Cummings, Cummings declared that he was ashamed of him and that The Guess Who would never record the song because the Beatles would sue them.

Bachman still felt like the main riff and verses were good, it was only when the song got to the chorus that everyone hated it. While BTO was still playing smaller venues in support of its first album, Bachman was driving into Vancouver for a gig and listening to the radio when he heard local DJ Daryl B's catch phrase "We're takin' care of business". Lead vocalist Fred Turner's voice gave out before the band's last set that night. Bachman sang some cover songs to get through the last set, and on a whim, he told the band to play the C, B-flat and F chords (a I-VII-IV progression) over and over, and he sang "White Collar Worker" with the new words "Takin' Care of Business" inserted into the chorus. Recalled Randy: "When we finished the song that night, people kept clapping, stomping, and shouting 'takin' care of business' over and over. So we picked up the tempo again and reprised the song for another ten minutes. Afterwards, we all knew we had something."

After this, he rewrote the lyrics to "White Collar Worker" with a new chorus and the title "Takin' Care of Business". The new lyrics also take a self-ironic glance at the idea of glamorous rock stars who don't really need to work, contrasted with working-class men, in a vein that prefigured Dire Straits' Money for Nothing a decade later. Along with this he wrote a revised guitar riff, which was the I-VII-IV progression played with a shuffle. Bachman says he then handed over the lyrics to Fred Turner with the thought that Turner would sing the lead vocal. But Turner handed them back, saying Randy should sing the lead as it would give himself a needed vocal break when the band performed live.

The original studio version, recorded at Kaye-Smith Studios in Seattle, Washington, features prominent piano, played by Norman Durkee. The reason for Durkee's presence at the studio, and on the track, has been the subject of conflicting information. Randy Bachman has repeatedly stated in interviews that Durkee was delivering pizzas at the time to musicians in the studio, overheard the song being rehearsed, and convinced the band that the song needed a piano part, and that Durkee, who was then an aspiring musician, should be the one to play it. However, both Robbie Bachman and Durkee himself have stated that Durkee was actually at the studio as a musician, recording commercials in the next room, when sound engineer Buzz Richmond asked him to play on "Takin' Care of Business". According to this version of events, Durkee had only a few minutes to spare, and, quickly conferring with Randy Bachman, he scribbled down the chords (on a pizza box), and, without listening to the song beforehand, recorded the piano part in one take.

Reception 
The song was recorded by Bachman–Turner Overdrive in late 1973 for their second album Bachman–Turner Overdrive II. It reached number 12 on the US Billboard Hot 100 (August 10, 1974), number 6 on the Cash Box Top 100, and number 3 on the Canadian RPM charts, and would become one of BTO's most enduring and well-known songs. "Takin' Care of Business" spent 20 weeks on the Billboard Hot 100, longer than any other BTO single.  Cash Box called it "hard rock with a strong blues base ," stating that "Randy Bachman's lead vocals are perfect and the group's music is unbeatable." Record World said that "Old 'TCB' expression now comes to mean 'total colossal boogie.'"

In 2011, Bachman said it was the most licensed song in Sony Music's publishing catalogue. It is often referred to as "the provincial rock anthem of Manitoba". Bachman himself uses the song as the theme for his syndicated radio music show Vinyl Tap.

Personnel 
Randy Bachman – lead guitar, lead vocals
Tim Bachman – second lead guitar, backing vocals
Fred Turner – bass, backing vocals
Robbie Bachman – drums, percussion
Norman Durkee – piano

Chart performance

Weekly charts

Year-end charts 

On May 7, 1994, Randy and a plugged-in stage band led 1300 guitarists to a Guinness World Record.....most guitarists ever gathered that played a song for over an hour.... by playing "Taking Care of Business for over an hour at Robson Square in Vancouver, a record that stands today.
In 1980, Kurtis Blow did a cover of Takin' Care of Business on his self-titled debut album, with Mercury Records.

Elvis and the TCB Band 
During his last few years of life, Elvis Presley adopted "Taking Care of Business in a Flash" as a motto, abbreviated as TCB and associated with a lightning bolt. The logo can be seen on one of his airplanes, and is still used in Elvis merchandise. His entertainment room at Graceland also shows his dedication to that motto. His last backup group was called the TCB Band, which still plays under the name. Elvis had been a major influence on Bachman, who in 2010 said he had been aware of rumours about the origins of the TCB name but had not had them confirmed until watching a documentary about Elvis in which his widow confirmed the BTO connection. In an interview with Larry London of Voice of America, Bachman commented that Elvis had recorded a version of the song but that it would probably never be released.

In 2004, Bachman rewrote the song into a Christmas version titled "Takin' Care of Christmas", which was released on a holiday CD of the same title.

In other media 
"Takin' Care of Business" has been used in multiple television shows and films, giving the song more recent popularity. It inspired the title of the 1990 comedy film Taking Care of Business, for which it was the theme song, and has been used in many other films, starring with Body Slam (1986), as well as major films like The Spirit of '76, The Replacements, A Knight's Tale, The Sandlot 2, About Schmidt, Two Weeks Notice, Daddy Day Care, the trailer for Robots as well as the documentaries Inside Job and 20 to 1. It has also appeared on many television series such as The Wonder Years, Quantum Leap, That 70s Show, American Dad!, The Simpsons, The Sopranos, King of the Hill, My Name Is Earl, Parks & Recreation, Arrested Development, Cold Case, Men of a Certain Age, Supernatural, and Hawaii Five-0. It also appeared twice on the Cartoon Network show Regular Show, in the episodes "Tent Trouble" and "VIP Members Only". Also in Tom Greens "Subway Monkey Hour" as he performs it in a street. The song "Takin' Care of Business" was also used in the commercials for Office Depot stores, which used the name of the song as the chain's slogan in the 1990s.

A small excerpt of a cover version by Thunderpussy was used in the 2019 film Fighting with My Family.

References

External links 
 
 

1973 songs
1974 singles
Bachman–Turner Overdrive songs
Mercury Records singles
Songs about labor
Songs written by Randy Bachman